Patricia Santana (born 1955 San Diego) is a Latina American novelist.

Life
She is the eighth of nine children of Mexican immigrants. Her parents are from El Grullo, Jalisco.

She graduated from University of California, San Diego, and from the University of California, Los Angeles with a master's degree in Comparative Literature.

She is a Spanish instructor at Cuyamaca Community College and is also an occasional visiting lecturer at the University of California, San Diego, where she teaches creative writing.

She is the mother of Deborah and Isaac.

Awards
 2009 American Book Award
 2008 Premio Aztlán Literary Prize
 2003 Best Books for Young Adults by the Young Adult Library Services Association (YALSA)
 1999 University of California, Irvine Chicano/Latino Literary Contest.

Works
  (reprint 2004)

References

External links
"Author's website"

1955 births
Writers from San Diego
University of California, San Diego alumni
University of California, Los Angeles alumni
University of California, San Diego faculty
Living people
American Book Award winners